Jiushan is a town in the western portion of Yuzhou, Xuchang, Henan, China.

History 
During the Song dynasty, Jiushan was home to a number of porcelain kilns. Ruins of some of the kilns remain today, and are a tourist attraction.

The town was home to Jiushan Red University, a Communist Party-run school where Party members went to receive ideological training and learn survival skills. The now-delipidated ruins of the school remain, and are a red tourist attraction.

Geography 

Administrative divisions 
Jiushan administers 31 administrative villages.

Economy 
Jiushan has 28,000 mu of arable land.

Transportation 
Henan Provincial Highway S325 runs through the town.

References 

Township-level divisions of Henan
Xuchang